Mitrella saotomensis is a species of sea snail in the family Columbellidae, the dove snails. This species is endemic to the island of São Tomé. The specific name saotomensis refers to the island where it was collected.

References

saotomensis
Endemic fauna of São Tomé Island
Invertebrates of São Tomé and Príncipe
Gastropods described in 2005